Arb Gardan (also Romanized as Arbʿ Gardan; also known as Arbūgardān) is a village in Lat Leyl Rural District, Otaqvar District, Langarud County, Gilan Province, Iran. At the 2006 census, its population was 29, in 7 families.

References 

Populated places in Langarud County